
Xinjiang, officially the Xinjiang Uyghur Autonomous Region (XUAR), is a province-level administrative autonomous region of China. 

Xinjiang may also refer to:

Xinjiang (historical area) (新疆) (Uyghur: شىنجاڭ), an area in Central Asia that includes the current region of China
Xin River (信江), an inflow of the Poyang Lake and tributary of the Gan River, Jiangxi
 Xinjiang, Minor planet 2336 in List of minor planets

Subdivisions of China
Xinjiang County (新绛县), a county in Yuncheng, Shanxi
Xinjiang Township (新江乡), a township in Suichuan County, Jiangxi

Towns
Xinjiang, Wengyuan County (新江), in Wengyuan County, Guangdong
Xinjiang, Guangxi (新江), in Nanning, Guangxi

Subdistricts
Xinjiang Subdistrict, Heyuan (新江街道), in Heyuan, Guangdong
Xinjiang Subdistrict, Harbin (新疆街道), in Harbin, Heilongjiang
Xinjiang Subdistrict, Neijiang (新江街道), in Neijiang, Sichuan

Related to XUAR
 East Turkestan, used mainly by the Uyghur diaspora to define this region
 Western Regions, a term used by Chinese before Xinjiang under Qing rule
 Xinjiang Province, a historical administrative area of China in between 1884 and 1955
 Xinjiang Production and Construction Corps, a province-level unique economic and paramilitary organization set up inside the Xinjiang Uyghur Autonomous Region in 1955, which is not is affiliated to it but operates in parallel

Xinjiang Road
Xinjiang Road, in Jing'an District, Shanghai
Xinjiang Road, in Heping District, Tianjin
Xinjiang Road, in Gushan District, Kaohsiung, Taiwan
Xinjiang Road, in Shibei District, Qingdao, Shandong

See also

Xinjian (disambiguation)